Lucifer is a little-known and degenerate genus of prawns, the type genus of the family Luciferidae. Lucifer has a long body, but many fewer appendages than other prawns, with only three pairs of pereiopods remaining, all without claws. It also bears no gills. The females, uniquely among prawns, carry the fertilised eggs on her pleopods until they are ready to hatch. This parallels the development of a similar system in pleocyemates, although the attachment is less strong in Lucifer. The length of the eye-stalks and the form of the petasma are used in distinguishing the eight species from each other.

The name Lucifer is Latin for "light bearer" was given to the genus because of these prawns' bioluminescence.

Two species are recognised:
Lucifer orientalis Hansen, 1919
Lucifer typus H. Milne-Edwards, 1837

Five nominal Lucifer species (L. chacei, L. faxoni, L. hanseni, L. intermedius, and L. penicillifer) have been reclassified in a distinct genus, Belzebub.

References

Dendrobranchiata
Decapod genera